Marie-Elsa Roche Bragg (born July 1965) is an English writer, Anglican priest and therapist.

She has written a novel, Towards Mellbreak (Mellbreak is a mountain in Cumbria) and a book, Sleeping Letters which she wrote during a silent retreat and describes as "a mixture of poetry, prose and fragments of un-sent letters to both her mother and father", on the death of her mother when she was a child.

Early life and education
Bragg describes herself as "half French, half Cumbrian", but was born and spent her childhood in London. Her parents are novelist and broadcaster Melvyn Bragg and his first wife, writer and artist Marie-Elisabeth Roche, who died when Marie-Elsa was aged six.

Bragg studied aspects of Judaism at Leo Baeck College, Karl Barth and systematic doctrine at King's College London, philosophy and theology at the University of Oxford, and studied for ordination at Ripon College Cuddesdon. She has an MA in prose fiction from the University of East Anglia.

Work
Bragg is a spiritual director, working with groups or individuals. She has been part-time assistant to the Chaplain to the Speaker of the House of Commons; has been a programme director in leadership development at the Said Business School in Oxford;  is a director of a coaching and leadership company Westminster Leadership; and has led an interfaith women's project on the difficulties of religious life, among other work. She is a duty chaplain at Westminster Abbey, and has a connection with Sénanque Abbey in southern France, and with the religious and literary traditions of the Lake District.

Selected publications

References

External links

 

1960s births
Living people
21st-century English Anglican priests
Women Anglican clergy
English women novelists
21st-century English novelists
Daughters of barons
Alumni of Leo Baeck College
Alumni of King's College London
Alumni of the University of Oxford
Alumni of the University of East Anglia
Alumni of Ripon College Cuddesdon
English poets
21st-century English women